A list of the 35 municipalities (comuni) of the Province of Lucca, Tuscany, Italy.

List
Altopascio
Bagni di Lucca
Barga
Borgo a Mozzano
Camaiore
Camporgiano
Capannori
Careggine
Castelnuovo di Garfagnana
Castiglione di Garfagnana
Coreglia Antelminelli
Fabbriche di Vergemoli
Forte dei Marmi
Fosciandora
Gallicano
Lucca (provincial capital)
Massarosa
Minucciano
Molazzana
Montecarlo
Pescaglia
Piazza al Serchio
Pietrasanta
Pieve Fosciana
Porcari
San Romano in Garfagnana
Seravezza
Sillano Giuncugnano
Stazzema
Vagli Sotto 
Viareggio
Villa Basilica
Villa Collemandina

See also
List of municipalities of Italy

References

 01
Lucca